Kirit is a town in the Burao District, in the Togdheer region of Somaliland. The town is 92 km southeast of Burao, the regional capital.  It located on the road connecting Burao and Las Anod. It belonged to the Saraar region, which was temporarily established in Somaliland.

The town is home to a fort, constructed by the Dervishes led by Mohammed Abdullah Hassan.

History
In August 2016, Somaliland's Minister of Third Country Resettlement, Minister of Education, and Minister of Livestock visited Kirit.

In March 2017, a major drought caused residents of nearby Indhodeeq and other areas to evacuate to Kirit. Kirit was also affected.

In August 2017, Muse Bihi Abdi, a candidate for president of Somaliland, visited Kirit.

In December 2017, Saraar police in Somaliland seized alcohol imported from Ethiopia in Kirit.

Natural Environment
Collared lark is present along the road southward from between Kirit and Oog. Dibatag used to inhabit the area, but has not been seen recently.

See also

References

Populated places in Togdheer